Bílá Třemešná is a municipality and village in Trutnov District in the Hradec Králové Region of the Czech Republic. It has about 1,300 inhabitants.

Administrative parts
The village of Nové Lesy is an administrative part of Bílá Třemešná.

Notable people
Oldřich Kolář (1898–?), cross-country skier

References

External links

Villages in Trutnov District